The United Kingdom of Great Britain and Northern Ireland (often referred to as Great Britain) competed at the 2011 World Championships in Athletics from 27 August - 4 September 2011.

Team selection

UK Athletics announced a team of 67 athletes on August 9 in preparation for the competition. Team GB will be represented by defending World Champions Phillips Idowu and Jessica Ennis in the triple jump and the heptathlon respectively, as well as Lisa Dobriskey and Jenny Meadows who won silver and bronze medals at the 2009 World Championships respectively. Selected athletes had achieved at least one of the competition's A or B qualifying standards.

Head coach Charles van Commenne has expressed a target of 10 medal opportunities, ahead of the 2012 Summer Olympics in London. Apart from the defending medallists, the team also includes the Women's 400m gold and silver medallists from the 2007 World Championships, Christine Ohuruogu and Nicola Sanders, respectively and two individual medallists from the 1999 World Championships, 100m bronze medallist Dwain Chambers and women's triple jump silver medallist Yamila Aldama.

In addition, the team includes 2 athletes invited by the IPC for exhibition events: Michael Bushell, 400m T53 (wheelchair) men, and Rochelle Woods, 800m T54 (wheelchair) women.

The following athletes appeared on the preliminary Entry List, but not on the Official Start List of the specific event, resulting in total number of 59 competitors:

Medallists
The following British competitors won medals at the Championships

| width="78%" align="left" valign="top" |

Results

Men

Women

Heptathlon

Footnotes

References

External links
Official competition website

Nations at the 2011 World Championships in Athletics
World Championships in Athletics
Athletics
Athletics in the United Kingdom
Great Britain and Northern Ireland at the World Championships in Athletics
Athletics in Northern Ireland